The Reading Formation is a geologic formation in southern England. It dates to the Paleocene period, and is part of the Lambeth Group. It overlies the London Basin and is below the Harwich Formation. The formation is composed of "a series of lenticular mottled clays and sands, here and there with pebbly beds and masses of fine sand converted into quartzite. These beds are generally unfossiliferous."

Clay sources
During the late medieval era, the Surrey whitewares pottery kilns were located near the Reading Formation, most notably the area between Farnham and Tongham The beds were an excellent source of white-firing clay.

See also

 List of fossiliferous stratigraphic units in England

References

Paleogene England